Feni Rosewidyadhari (born November 1, 1973) is an Indonesian TV presenter and entrepreneur. She is notable for her performance of "Ibu Dewi" in a "Sabun Surf" advertisement, and as a presenter in the "Silet" infotainment program on RCTI and Formula One in RCTI, TPI, and GlobalTV.

Profile
Feni Rose is an alumnus of the Universitas Indonesia, majoring in Anthropology. She began her television career in 1999 when she became a quiz presenter in the Formula One live show on RCTI.

In 2002, she (with F1 live) moved to TPI. She also presents the soccer program "Liga Italia Serie-A" on TPI.

Feni and her husband Enkito Herman Nugroho own the production house company "Light’s on Production".

Hobby
She has hobby of aerobic and she conducted Prima Raga in ANTV and in 2012 when her age is 38, she became a presenter of aerobic Fresh & Fun.

References 

1973 births
Living people
Javanese people
People from Malang
University of Indonesia alumni
Indonesian television presenters
Indonesian women television presenters
Indonesian sports announcers